Bougatsa is a Greek breakfast pastry (sweet or savoury) consisting of semolina custard.

Origin
The name comes from the Byzantine Greek πογάτσα (pogátsa), from the ancient Roman pānis focācius, literally "hearth bread"; c.f. Italian focaccia.  It may have had a classical origin in the Roman-era placenta cake. A similar dessert is still known as placenta on the island of Lesbos in Greece.

It is found in Thessaloniki and in the Central Macedonia region of Northern Greece, particularly the city of Serres, where it was brought in the 20th century by Greek refugees from Constantinople. The taste of bougatsa varies between regions of Greece. For example, bougatsa in Veria is very sweet and full of cream, while in Thessaloniki it is crunchy and not that sweet, and in Chania Crete it is made of local mizithra cheese and sprinkled with sugar.

Preparation

Greek bougatsa is prepared from phyllo dough wrapped around a filling. After it is baked, it is cut into serving pieces and served hot. If the filling is semolina custard, then the pastry may be lightly dusted with powdered sugar and/or cinnamon.

Most modern bougatsa is made with machine-made phyllo, but some cafes and bakeries selling hand-made bougatsa still exist, especially in smaller towns and villages of Greece.

Trivia
The city of Serres achieved the record for the largest puff pastry on 1 June 2008.

The process of making bougatsa by hand was featured on an episode of Anthony Bourdain: No Reservations filmed in Greece.

See also
 Galaktoboureko
 Pogača
 Tyropita, a pie made with cheese
 Spanakopita, a pie made with spinach and sometimes cheese
 Focaccia
 Banitsa, a similar pie from Bulgaria
 List of custard desserts

References

Works cited

Sources
 foccacia.gr

Custard desserts
Greek desserts
Greek pastries
Greek Macedonian cuisine
Stuffed dishes
Breakfast dishes